Josif Chirilă (sometimes listes as Iosif Chirilă, born 5 January 1983) is a Romanian sprint canoer who has competed since 2004. He won four medals at the ICF Canoe Sprint World Championships with two golds (C-4 500 m: 2005, C-4 1000 m: 2007), a silver (C-2 500 m: 2007), and a bronze (C-4 1000 m: 2009).

Chirilǎ also finished sixth in the C-2 500 m event at the 2008 Summer Olympics in Beijing.

References
 
 
 
 

1983 births
Canoeists at the 2008 Summer Olympics
Canoeists at the 2012 Summer Olympics
Living people
Olympic canoeists of Romania
Romanian male canoeists
ICF Canoe Sprint World Championships medalists in Canadian